"Jack and the Beanstalk" was an American television play broadcast on November 12, 1956, as part of the NBC television series, Producers' Showcase.

Plot
The production revived the fairy tale of a boy who trades the family's cow for a handful of magic beans. It included new characters and 11 original songs.

Cast
The following performers received screen credit for their performances:
 Joel Grey as Jack
 Celeste Holm as Mad Maggie
 Cyril Ritchard as The Peddler
 Peggy King as Tillie Hemmelpacker
 Arnold Stang as Mr. Fum
 Leora Dana as The Widow Tooper
 Billy Gilbert as Mr. Poopledoop
 Dennis King as Narrator

Production
Clark Jones was the director and Mort Abrahams was the executive producer. It was written by Helen Deutsch. The music was by Jerry Livingston with lyrics by Helen Deutsch.

Reception
In The New York Times, Jack Gould that the production had plenty of sets and stars but lacked "the spirit of make-believe" and "only achieved an intermittent glow." He also noted that Joel Grey was "much too old for the part."

Bob Blackburn called it "sickeningly moral and harmless."

References

American television films
1956 television plays